Damian Gibson (born 14 May 1975) is a former Wales international rugby league footballer.

Early life
Gibson was born and raised in Rockhampton, Queensland, Australia.

He attended Emmaus College before being signed by the Newcastle Knights.

Playing career
After spending 1994 with the Newcastle Knights, where he represented the NSW City under-19 side, Gibson signed with the newly established North Queensland Cowboys. In Round 1 of the 1995 ARL season, Gibson made his first grade début as a 19-year-old in the North Queensland Cowboys first ever game. He scored the club's first ever try in the 16–32 loss to the Canterbury-Bankstown Bulldogs, and was named in the Norwich Rising Star Team of 95. He spent two seasons with the Cowboys, scoring 7 tries in 31 games and was the North Queensland Cowboys Top Tryscorer in 1996.

In 1997, Gibson joined the Leeds Rhinos in the Super League, scoring three tries and being named their Player of the Year. He transferred to the Halifax Blue Sox in 1998, where he spent the majority of his career. During his first stint with Halifax, he scored 40 tries in 113 games. In June 1998, he made his international début for Wales, in a 15–12 loss to England.

In 2002, he joined the Salford City Reds, spending one season at the Willows before moving to the Castleford Tigers (Heritage No. 794) in 2003, following the Reds' relegation. He re-joined Halifax in November 2004 after being released by the Castleford Tigers following their relegation from Super League and went on to score 15 tries in 30 appearances in 2005. After four more seasons at Halifax, Gibson joined the Sheffield Eagles in 2009, retiring at the end of the season.

Statistics

ARL

Super League

Post-playing career
Following his retirement, Gibson served as an assistant coach for the Exiles rugby league team, Leeds Rhinos, Welsh national team, and the Dewsbury Rams. While at the Rhinos, he coached the club's under-18 and under-20 sides and was on the coaching staff for their 2011 Super League Grand Final winning season.

References

External links
Leeds Rhinos profile
Statistics at thecastlefordtigers.co.uk

1975 births
Living people
Australian people of Welsh descent
Australian rugby league coaches
Australian rugby league players
Australian expatriate sportspeople in England
Castleford Tigers players
Halifax R.L.F.C. players
Leeds Rhinos players
North Queensland Cowboys players
Rugby league centres
Rugby league fullbacks
Rugby league players from Rockhampton, Queensland
Rugby league wingers
Salford Red Devils players
Sheffield Eagles players
Wales national rugby league team players